Terra II is a open-ended, play-by-mail (PBM) wargame published by Clemens & Associates.

History and development
Terra II was a tribal-based play-by-mail game published by Clemens & Associates of San Clemente, CA. The game was computer moderated and open-ended.

Gameplay
The game's setting was the medieval period. Its map comprised 10-mile hexes with 22 types of terrain. In the game, players led tribes displaced by an ice age. Available tribe actions included "herding, hunting, weapon making, mining, and most of the other actions that would be found in a medieval period". The game featured realistic and detailed combat. Player could choose from a variety of paths, including exploration, trading and economics, combat, and business pursuits.

Reception
William Callaway reviewed the game in a 1984 issue of Paper Mayhem. He stated that the only game drawback related to its complexity which "may only appeal to the most sophisticated and experienced PBM gamers". John Rees reviewed the game in a 1984 issue of Flagship, stating, "I recommend this game with slight hesitation", pointing to a preference toward more active closed-end games. In a later 1984 issue of Flagship, John Muir stated, "this is an excellent, fast-paced game with moderate charges". The editor of the U.S. edition of Flagship, Tim Sullivan, reviewed Terra II in a 1988 issue of the D2 Report. He stated that it was "one of the most realistic and reliable tribal clan simulations around".

See also
 List of play-by-mail games

References

Bibliography

 
 
 
 
 
 
 

Science fiction games
Multiplayer games
Play-by-mail games